Villy "Willy" Elvira Thulin (later Sandberg, 26 October 1889 – 3 May 1967) was a Swedish diver. She competed in the 1912 Summer Olympics, but was eliminated in the first round of the 10 m platform event. Her younger sister Vera competed in swimming at the same Olympics.

References

1889 births
1967 deaths
Swedish female divers
Olympic divers of Sweden
Divers at the 1912 Summer Olympics
Stockholms KK divers
Sportspeople from Uppsala
19th-century Swedish women
20th-century Swedish women